Annai Violet Arts and Science College is a college in Menambedu, Ambattur, Chennai, Tamil Nadu, India.

History
Annai Violet Arts and Science College was started by Nesarathinam Educational trust founded by N.R. Dhanapalan in the year of 1997. The college is affiliated to University of Madras, ISO 9001:2008 certified and accredited to National Assessment and Accreditation Council (NAAC).

References

External links
 

Educational institutions established in 1997
Arts colleges in India
Colleges affiliated to University of Madras
1997 establishments in Tamil Nadu